The arrondissement of Chartres is an arrondissement of France in the Eure-et-Loir department in the Centre-Val de Loire region. It has 148 communes.

Composition

The communes of the arrondissement of Chartres, and their INSEE codes, are:

 Allonnes (28004)
 Amilly (28006)
 Ardelu (28009)
 Aunay-sous-Auneau (28013)
 Auneau-Bleury-Saint-Symphorien (28015)
 Bailleau-Armenonville (28023)
 Bailleau-l'Évêque (28022)
 Bailleau-le-Pin (28021)
 Barjouville (28024)
 Barmainville (28025)
 Baudreville (28026)
 Beauvilliers (28032)
 Berchères-Saint-Germain (28034)
 Berchères-les-Pierres (28035)
 Béville-le-Comte (28039)
 Billancelles (28040)
 Blandainville (28041)
 Boisville-la-Saint-Père (28047)
 Boncé (28049)
 Bouglainval (28052)
 La Bourdinière-Saint-Loup (28048)
 Briconville (28060)
 Cernay (28067)
 Challet (28068)
 Champhol (28070)
 Champseru (28073)
 La Chapelle-d'Aunainville (28074)
 Charonville (28081)
 Chartainvilliers (28084)
 Chartres (28085)
 Les Châtelliers-Notre-Dame (28091)
 Châtenay (28092)
 Chauffours (28095)
 Chuisnes (28099)
 Cintray (28100)
 Clévilliers (28102)
 Coltainville (28104)
 Corancez (28107)
 Le Coudray (28110)
 Courville-sur-Eure (28116)
 Dammarie (28122)
 Dangers (28128)
 Denonville (28129)
 Droue-sur-Drouette (28135)
 Écrosnes (28137)
 Éole-en-Beauce (28406)
 Épeautrolles (28139)
 Épernon (28140)
 Ermenonville-la-Grande (28141)
 Ermenonville-la-Petite (28142)
 Fontaine-la-Guyon (28154)
 Fontenay-sur-Eure (28158)
 Francourville (28160)
 Le Favril (28148)
 Fresnay-le-Comte (28162)
 Fresnay-le-Gilmert (28163)
 Fresnay-l'Évêque (28164)
 Fruncé (28167)
 Gallardon (28168)
 Garancières-en-Beauce (28169)
 Gas (28172)
 Gasville-Oisème (28173)
 Gellainville (28177)
 Gommerville (28183)
 Gouillons (28184)
 Le Gué-de-Longroi (28188)
 Guilleville (28189)
 Hanches (28191)
 Houville-la-Branche (28194)
 Houx (28195)
 Illiers-Combray (28196)
 Intréville (28197)
 Janville-en-Beauce (28199)
 Jouy (28201)
 Landelles (28203)
 Léthuin (28207)
 Levainville (28208)
 Lèves (28209)
 Levesville-la-Chenard (28210)
 Louville-la-Chenard (28215)
 Lucé (28218)
 Luisant (28220)
 Luplanté (28222)
 Magny (28225)
 Maintenon (28227)
 Mainvilliers (28229)
 Maisons (28230)
 Marchéville (28234)
 Mérouville (28243)
 Méréglise (28242)
 Meslay-le-Grenet (28245)
 Mévoisins (28249)
 Mignières (28253)
 Mittainvilliers-Vérigny (28254)
 Moinville-la-Jeulin (28255)
 Mondonville-Saint-Jean (28257)
 Morainville (28268)
 Morancez (28269)
 Moutiers (28274)
 Neuvy-en-Beauce (28276)
 Nogent-le-Phaye (28278)
 Nogent-sur-Eure (28281)
 Oinville-Saint-Liphard (28284)
 Oinville-sous-Auneau (28285)
 Ollé (28286)
 Orrouer (28290)
 Ouarville (28291)
 Oysonville (28294)
 Pierres (28298)
 Poinville (28300)
 Poisvilliers (28301)
 Pontgouin (28302)
 Prasville (28304)
 Prunay-le-Gillon (28309)
 Réclainville (28313)
 Roinville (28317)
 Rouvray-Saint-Denis (28319)
 Saint-Arnoult-des-Bois (28324)
 Saint-Aubin-des-Bois (28325)
 Saint-Denis-des-Puits (28333)
 Saint-Éman (28336)
 Saint-Georges-sur-Eure (28337)
 Saint-Germain-le-Gaillard (28339)
 Saint-Luperce (28350)
 Saint-Léger-des-Aubées (28344)
 Saint-Martin-de-Nigelles (28352)
 Saint-Piat (28357)
 Saint-Prest (28358)
 Sainville (28363)
 Sandarville (28365)
 Santeuil (28366)
 Santilly (28367)
 Soulaires (28379)
 Sours (28380)
 Theuville (28383)
 Thivars (28388)
 Toury (28391)
 Trancrainville (28392)
 Umpeau (28397)
 Ver-lès-Chartres (28403)
 Vierville (28408)
 Les Villages Vovéens (28422)
 Villars (28411)
 Villebon (28414)
 Voise (28421)
 Yermenonville (28423)
 Ymeray (28425)
 Ymonville (28426)

History

The arrondissement of Chartres was created in 1800.

As a result of the reorganisation of the cantons of France which came into effect in 2015, the borders of the cantons are no longer related to the borders of the arrondissements. The cantons of the arrondissement of Chartres were, as of January 2015:

 Auneau
 Chartres-Nord-Est
 Chartres-Sud-Est
 Chartres-Sud-Ouest
 Courville-sur-Eure
 Illiers-Combray
 Janville
 Lucé
 Maintenon
 Mainvilliers
 Voves

References

Chartres